Christopher Wernitznig (born 24 February 1990) is an Austrian professional footballer who plays as a midfielder for Austria Klagenfurt in the Austrian Bundesliga.

References

1990 births
Living people
Association football midfielders
Austrian footballers
Austria under-21 international footballers
SV Spittal players
FC Wacker Innsbruck (2002) players
Wolfsberger AC players
SK Austria Klagenfurt players
Austrian Football Bundesliga players
People from Villach
Footballers from Carinthia (state)